MKY is a three-letter acronym that may refer to:

Mackay Airport (IATA: MKY) in Mackay, Queensland, Australia.
Marco Island Airport (FAA: MKY) in Marco Island, Florida, United States.